Ryosuke Ochi (越智 亮介, born April 7, 1990) is a Japanese football player who plays for FC Imabari.

Club statistics
Updated to 23 February 2018.

References

External links

Profile at Fujieda MYFC

1990 births
Living people
People from Imabari, Ehime
Association football people from Ehime Prefecture
Japanese footballers
J2 League players
J3 League players
Japan Football League players
Ehime FC players
Zweigen Kanazawa players
Fujieda MYFC players
FC Ryukyu players
FC Imabari players
Association football midfielders